Fast Simple QSO (FSQ) is an amateur radio digital differential frequency modulation mode developed by Con Wassilieff ZL2AFP with Murray Greenman ZL1BPU in 2015.

FSQ is used primarily on HF on fixed frequency channels. VHF adaptions of FSQ are also supported using VHF FM.  The FSQ modulation, coding and FSQCall protocol are publicly disclosed and described, and the software is open source. FSQ works well under NVIS (a propagation mode for short-medium distance communications) and sunrise/sunset conditions on the lower bands, and also works well for short skip and grey-line on higher bands.

Characteristics 
FSQ uses incremental frequency keying (IFK+) and has efficient alphabet encoding as well as no need for syncing to receive.  FSQ is essentially a sped-up version of the weak-signal mode WSQ2, introduced in 2013. It also uses 33 tones, in this case spaced 9Hz apart (actually 8.7890625Hz, exactly 1.5× the baud rate at the highest speed), resulting in a signal bandwidth of 300Hz, including the keying sidebands.  The ITU emission designator is 300HF1B. The modulation is constant amplitude, phase coherent multiple frequency shift keying (MFSK), using IFK+ coding with 32 frequency differences, yielding 32 unique codes.  This means that each symbol carries enough information for all lower case letters to be expressed in just one symbol, which greatly enhances the speed.

Software 
 FSQCall
 fldigi

References

External links
 
 

Amateur radio
Radio modulation modes